Nicola Asuni (born 4 January 1973, in Cagliari) is a former Italian sprinter.

Biography
Nicola Asuni won two medals with the national relay team at the International athletics competitions.

Achievements

National titles
Nicola Asuni has won just one time the national championship.
1 win in 4×100 metres relay (1998)

See also
 Italy national relay team

References

External links

1973 births
Sportspeople from Cagliari
Italian male sprinters
Living people
Mediterranean Games gold medalists for Italy
Athletes (track and field) at the 1991 Mediterranean Games
Mediterranean Games medalists in athletics
Athletics competitors of Centro Sportivo Carabinieri
20th-century Italian people